Wushu has been contested at the Asian Games since 1990 in Beijing, China.

Editions

Events

Medal table

Participating nations

List of medalists

References

 
Sports at the Asian Games
Asian Games